Asprokremmos dam is the second largest dam in Cyprus. It is built at an altitude of about 100 m above sea level and is located 16 km, (10 miles) east of the city of Pafos.

Due to  poor rainfall it is a rare event that the dam overflows. On 27 January 2012  the dam did overflow, for the first time since 2004.

It subsequently overflowed again in March 2019 and again in January 2020.

It is considered an important wetland for endemic and migratory birds

See also
 List of reservoirs and dams in Cyprus

References

Dams in Cyprus
Dams completed in 1982
1982 establishments in Cyprus
Buildings and structures in Paphos District